The 2008 Goody's Cool Orange 500 was the sixth race of the 2008 NASCAR Sprint Cup season, and was run on Sunday, March 30, 2008 at Martinsville Speedway in Martinsville, Virginia.  This race aired on Fox starting at 1:30 PM US EDT and radio was handled by Motor Racing Network and Sirius Satellite Radio starting their programming at 1:15 PM US EDT.  The race marked the start of the use of the 2008 Top 35 owners points exemption for each week's race for the 2008 season. This was the first points paying race without Dale Jarrett since the 1990 TranSouth 500.

Pre-Race News
As announced, Michael McDowell will debut as the new driver of the #00 Michael Waltrip Racing Toyota Camry for David Reutimann, who moves to the team's #44 car for Dale Jarrett.  Jarrett would drive the #44 one last time at the Sprint All-Star Race XXIV on May 17 in Concord, North Carolina.  All three MWR teams are safely in the weekly Top 35 Owners Points exemption for this race.
Bill Davis Racing's #27 team suspended operations due to a lack of sponsorship.
BAM Racing has switched from Dodge to Toyota as of this week.

Qualifying
Jeff Gordon won the pole for this race, the 65th in his career. Kyle Petty, who was outside the Top 35 exemption rule, failed to qualify for a race for the first time since the 2004 season.

Full qualifying results 

OP: qualified via owners points

PC: qualified as past champion

PR: provisional

QR: via qualifying race

* - had to qualify on time

Results

Failed to qualify: Kyle Petty (#45), Tony Raines (#08), John Andretti (#34), Joe Nemechek (#78).

References

Goody's Cool Orange 500
Goody's Cool Orange 500
NASCAR races at Martinsville Speedway
March 2008 sports events in the United States